Maja e Gurit të Topit is a mountain peak in the Valamara range, in eastern Albania. Maja e Gurit të Topit peak is located in the north of Valamara.

References

Mountains of Albania